Khao tom  (also spelled kao tom), or Khao tom mat is a Southeast Asian dessert eaten by Laotian and Thai people, consisting of seasoned steamed sticky rice wrapped in banana leaves. Other names include Khao tom mad, Khao tom kluai, Khao tom phat, and Khao tom luk yon.

Dishes that are similar to Khao tom mat can also be found in the Philippines (known as suman), Cambodia (known as Num ansom), Indonesia (lepet) and foods from Vietnam such as bánh tét and Bánh chưng.

Variants
This dessert can be either savoury (filled with pork fat and mung bean) or sweet (filled with coconut milk and banana). In Thailand, Khao tom mat is sometimes colored blue with Clitoria ternatea flowers.
Typically Khao tom mat have Black beans and Banana as the main ingredients.
The Khao tom mat various flavors by the ingredients used inside i.e. Taro, Banana, Pork, etc., brought each name to Khao tom mat; Khao tom mat sai pheuak (Taro), Khao tom mat sai kluai (Banana), Khao tom mat sai mu (Pork).

Traditions
The Sai Krachat tradition (ประเพณีใส่กระจาด), also known as Suea Krachat or Soe Krachat in Phuan language is a merit-making Buddhist tradition of the Thai Phuan people of in Ban Mi District, Lopburi Province. It takes place on the eve of the Great Birth Sermon celebration. One day prior to the Sai Krachat Day, people wrap khao tom and grind rice for khao pun rice noodles. The next day is the Sai Krachat Day when people bring things such as bananas, sugar cane, oranges, candles, and joss sticks or other items to put into the bamboo baskets at the houses of the people they know, while the hosts bring the prepared food to welcome their guests. When the visitors wish to go home, the host  gives khao tom mat as a souvenir in return called Khuen Krachat.

In Thailand, khao tom mat is the symbol of couples because the couple are matched and bound together with thin bamboo-strip (string). Thai people believe that if a pair of people offer khao tom mat to monks on Khao Phansa Day, which is beginning of the 3 months of Buddhist lent during the rainy season and the time when monks retreat to a monastery and concentrate on Buddhist teachings, married life will be smooth and there will be a stable love like a pair of khao tom mat.

Khao tom mat is also a traditional Thai dessert for Ok Phansa Day (the end of Buddhist lent in late October.), but it is then called Khao tom luk yon. It is wrapped up in a young mangrove fan palm leaf with long-tails to hold before tossing them to a Buddha image, after which monks can carry them away.

In 2014, the Department of Cultural Promotion under the Ministry of Culture, registered the Khao tom mat as an intangible cultural heritage, in the Knowledge and Practices Concerning Nature and the Universe category, to prevent them from being lost along with other cultural heritage.

See also
 Htamanè
 Glutinous rice
 Mango sticky rice
 Khao lam
 List of Thai desserts

References

Bibliography

External links

Juicy Dishes - (Thai) Khao tom
Image of Kao tom mat.

Glutinous rice dishes
Thai desserts and snacks
Laotian desserts
Stuffed desserts